Jesse Ray Ernster is a Canadian-born American mixing engineer, audio engineer, and record producer, based in Los Angeles. He has worked with artists including Kanye West, Burna Boy, Doja Cat, and Goody Grace.

Ernster mixed Doja Cat's top 10 hit, Woman (Doja Cat song) and has earned one win at the Grammy Awards for his contributions to the album Twice as Tall by Burna Boy.

References

External links
 
 

Living people
American audio engineers
American record producers
Canadian audio engineers
Canadian emigrants to the United States
Canadian record producers
Grammy Award winners
People from Winnipeg
Year of birth missing (living people)